Tina Takahashi is a judoka, coach, and author who won Canada's first ever gold medal in international Judo at the World University Games in 1984, and was Canada's first women's Olympic Judo coach in 1988, coaching Canada's first women's Judo Olympian Sandra Greaves. She was the first Canadian woman to achieve the rank of roku-dan (sixth-degree black belt), and the first women's Sport Canada carded athlete. Takahashi was Canadian champion 9 times, has taught Judo for more than 30 years, and was inducted into the Judo Canada Hall of Fame in 1998.  Also in 2016, she was inducted into the Ottawa Sports Hall of Fame. In 2008, she was named as Chair of the National Grading Board by Judo Canada. Takahashi is the daughter of Canadian judoka Masao Takahashi and June Takahashi, and the sister of Olympians Phil Takahashi and Ray Takahashi.

In 2005, she co-authored a book titled Mastering Judo with her parents and three siblings.

Publications

Education 
Bachelor of Physical Education, Bachelor of Education & Ontario Teachers Certificate

Championships and Accomplishments

Highlights 
 Judo Canada Hall of Fame Inductee
 Former Olympic Judo coach
 World University Judo champion
 6th degree Black Belt
 Former World Sambo Champion
 Co-Author of "Mastering Judo" by Masao Takahashi & Family

Competitive Highlights (National and International Tournaments) 
 World University Championship - 1st place (1984 France)
 World Sambo Championships - 1st place (1980 Montreal)
 Pacific Rim - 1st place (1981 Japan, 1980 Hawaii)
 World Championships - 5th place (1980 USA, 1982 France)
 Senior Canadian Judo Nationals - 1st place (1976, 1978-1984)
 Canada Cup - 1st place (1980 Montreal)
 Cadet Canadian Nationals - 1st place (1974, 1976, 1977)
Quebec Open - 1st place (1979-1981 Montreal)
 Pan Am Games - 3rd place (1983 Caracas, Venezuela)
 French International - 3rd place (1981 France)
 British Open - 3rd place (1977 England)
 Dutch Open - 3rd place (1981 Holland)
 Pan American Championships - 3rd place (1982 Chile, 1984 Mexico, 1985 Cuba)
 Pan American Championships - 2nd place (1980 Venezuela)
 Desert Open - 1st place (1980 Arizona)

Awards 
 Ottawa Sport Hall of Fame (inducted June 3, 2016)
 Canadian Asian of the Year Finalist (2011 Sheila Copps Award)
 Female Coach of the Year Award from Judo Ontario (2010)
 Life member Judo Ontario/Judo Canada
 Certificate of Recognition, Pioneer of Women's Competitive Judo JC (2006)
 Judo Ontario Hall of Fame (2002)
 Judo Canada Hall of Fame (1998)
 City of Nepean Wall of Fame (1986)
 Canadian Sport Award, Athlete of the Month (1984)
 International Achievement Award, Sport Federation of Canada (1980)
 Ontario Distinguished Performance Achievement Award (1976-1984)

Judo Canada CAREER ACHIEVEMENT CATEGORIES 
 COACHING: ’88 OLYMPICS, ’86 WORLDS, ’87 WORLDS COMPETITOR: ’80 WORLDS, ’82 WORLDS, ’84 WORLDS CONTRIBUTION TO SPORT: Chair National Grading Board ORIGINAL SENSEI: RENEE HOCK ’93 & ’95 WORLDS Promoted to Rokudan (6th degree) in 2003 (14 years as 6th dan)  Judo practitioner for over 50 years, teaching/coaching for 40 years.
 Coached Women’s National team at over 20 international tournaments throughout Europe, Asia, Africa, North, South and Central America
 Participated in many national and international training camps and clinics throughout the world. NCCP level 3 certified
 Judo Ontario Provincial Coach at several National Championships
 Coached Ontario Winter Games for the East Region
 Coached Women’s National Team in Ottawa ‘85-‘88, and at the Seoul Olympics. Judo Canada National Team Resource Coach until mid 1990s. Tina's three sons who are all National judo medalists. (Adam 3rd 2015 2nd 2011), Torin (1st x 2, 2011, 2012, 2nd x2, 2015, 2013, 2009 +), Liam Macfadyen (3rd 2012)
 Taught judo to children, teens and adults recreationally and in schools for 40 years.
 Taught judo to Prime Minister Justin Trudeau and his brothers and all the children of former Prime Minister, Brian Mulroney

Coaching Highlights with Women’s National Team 
 1988 Olympic Games in Korea
 1986 World Championships in Netherlands
 1987 World Championships in Germany
 1987 Pan Am Games in Indianapolis, USA
 1989 Francophonie Games in Morocco
 3-time Fukuoka International Women’s Championships in Japan

Volunteer Highlights 
 Chairperson for Judo Canada’s National Grading Board (2008)
 Member of Judo Canada National Grading Board (2004-2008)
 Member Judo Ontario Black Belt Grading Board (2000-present)
 Women’s National Judo Team Representative (mid ‘80s)
 Assistant Regional Director of East Region (early ‘90s)
 Provincial "A" referee
 East Region Tournament Organizer

Kata (Pre-arranged forms/patterns of movement) 
 1st place in Nage no Kata CNE Int’l 1989, medaled in Ju-no- kata, Katame-no-kata
 Course conductor kata, gokyo and competitive clinics in Ontario and Quebec
 Judge Pan Ams and several Nationals
 Chair for the National Grading Board
 Organizer of kata judging seminars in 2008 with Kuniko Takeuchi Sensei, Chairperson Pan Am Kata Committee

Athlete Development (National and International Judo Champions) 
Original sensei, coached many athletes from children to national and international champions.  i.e.  Renee Hock (World competitor ’93, ’95, many int’l medals, Sr.Ntl champ ‘86), Tony Walby (para Olympics 2012, IBSA Worlds 2014, Sr. Ntl Champ 2008 & multi time National medals), Evan O’Leary (Masters Ntl champ), Karen Hayde (KDK Cup Brazil champ, Sr. Ntl champ ‘95), Linda Konkol (Sr. Ntl champ ‘89), Julie Leblanc (Sr. Ntl champ ’85, US Open 2nd, 3rd, ‘’87-’88)  Michael and Kristina Kiss (Juv. Ntl champs) Dave Shapiro (Juv, Ntl champ), Torin Macfadyen (U18 Ntl champ, U15 Ntl Champ), Sean Macfadyen (Masters Pan Am champ ’07, QC Open ’09, RMC Int’l 2009, Sr. Prov Team member) Stewart Tanaka (Sr. Ntl medalist), Thomas Filter (Jr. Ntl champ '02), Alicia Rimad (U17 Ntl Champ '10)

Videos and Photos
 Tina Takahashi on CTV Ottawa Morning Live, Part 1, Part 2, Part 3 (CTV Ottawa Morning Live on YouTube)
 Tina Takahashi Martial Art and Fitness (Videos)
 Photos

See also
 Judo in Ontario
Judo in Canada
 List of Canadian judoka

References

External links
 
 Tina Takahashi Martial Arts

Canadian female judoka
Sportspeople from Toronto
Canadian sportspeople of Japanese descent
Pan American Games medalists in judo
Living people
Pan American Games bronze medalists for Canada
Year of birth missing (living people)
Judoka at the 1983 Pan American Games
Medalists at the 1983 Pan American Games